Khalid Reeves (born July 15, 1972) is a former American professional basketball player who played six seasons in the National Basketball Association (NBA). He was selected by the Miami Heat in the first round (12th pick) of the 1994 NBA draft.

Reeves attended  Christ The King Regional High School in Middle Village, Queens, New York, and played college basketball at the University of Arizona.

College career
Reeves found his way to UA when he told his high school coach he wanted to play in a warm climate. His coach, Bob Oliva, reached out to then-UA coach Lute Olson and his staff. Reeves went on to be one of the most prolific scorers in UA history, still owning the season scoring record of 848 points achieved in 1993-94 a 2010 report remembered. He led the Wildcats to the 1994 NCAA Final Four with backcourt teammate Damon Stoudamire. The Wildcats lost to eventual champion Arkansas.

Professional career
Reeves played for numerous NBA teams from 1994 to 2000, averaging 7.8 points per game for his career. The last NBA team Reeves played for was the Chicago Bulls during the 1999-2000 season. After Reeves' NBA career ended, he continued to play professionally for smaller US-based leagues and in Greece, France, Lebanon, and Venezuela before retiring in 2005.

Coaching career
Reeves is currently an assistant coach at his high school alma mater, Christ the King Regional High School.

References

External links 
 
MavsWiki.com

1972 births
Living people
African-American basketball players
All-American college men's basketball players
American expatriate basketball people in France
American expatriate basketball people in Greece
American expatriate basketball people in Lebanon
American expatriate basketball people in Venezuela
American men's basketball players
Basketball players from New York City
Aris B.C. players
Arizona Wildcats men's basketball players
Charlotte Hornets players
Chicago Bulls players
Dallas Mavericks players
Detroit Pistons players
Élan Béarnais players
Grand Rapids Hoops players
Greek Basket League players
McDonald's High School All-Americans
Miami Heat draft picks
Miami Heat players
New Jersey Nets players
Panteras de Miranda players
Parade High School All-Americans (boys' basketball)
Point guards
Shooting guards
Sportspeople from Queens, New York
21st-century African-American sportspeople
20th-century African-American sportspeople